Tomonori Ohara  is a Japanese mixed martial artist. He competed in the Lightweight and Welterweight divisions.

Mixed martial arts record

|-
| Loss
| align=center| 5-12-1
| Naoki Kimura
| TKO (punches)
| Deep - Hero 1
| 
| align=center| 1
| align=center| 2:15
| Nagoya, Aichi, Japan
| 
|-
| Loss
| align=center| 5-11-1
| Yasuyuki Tokuoka
| Technical Submission (armbar)
| Shooto - To The Top 7
| 
| align=center| 1
| align=center| 2:37
| Osaka, Japan
| 
|-
| Loss
| align=center| 5-10-1
| Takayuki Okochi
| Decision (unanimous)
| Shooto - Gig East 2
| 
| align=center| 2
| align=center| 5:00
| Tokyo, Japan
| 
|-
| Loss
| align=center| 5-9-1
| Hiroshi Tsuruya
| Submission (kimura)
| Shooto - R.E.A.D. 6
| 
| align=center| 1
| align=center| 0:50
| Tokyo, Japan
| 
|-
| Loss
| align=center| 5-8-1
| Saburo Kawakatsu
| Submission (armbar)
| Shooto - R.E.A.D. 3
| 
| align=center| 1
| align=center| 2:26
| Kadoma, Osaka, Japan
| 
|-
| Loss
| align=center| 5-7-1
| Yuji Ito
| Decision (unanimous)
| Shooto - Shooto
| 
| align=center| 5
| align=center| 3:00
| Tokyo, Japan
| 
|-
| Win
| align=center| 5-6-1
| Tomohiro Tanaka
| TKO (punches)
| Shooto - Shooto
| 
| align=center| 1
| align=center| 2:03
| Tokyo, Japan
| 
|-
| Loss
| align=center| 4-6-1
| Yoshimasa Ishikawa
| N/A
| Shooto - Shooto
| 
| align=center| 3
| align=center| 0:54
| Tokyo, Japan
| 
|-
| Loss
| align=center| 4-5-1
| Yuichi Watanabe
| Submission (kneebar)
| Shooto - Shooto
| 
| align=center| 1
| align=center| 0:00
| Tokyo, Japan
| 
|-
| Win
| align=center| 4-4-1
| Yoshimasa Ishikawa
| TKO (broken hand)
| Shooto - Shooto
| 
| align=center| 2
| align=center| 2:35
| Osaka, Japan
| 
|-
| Draw
| align=center| 3-4-1
| Takashi Tojo
| Draw
| Shooto - Shooto
| 
| align=center| 4
| align=center| 3:00
| Tokyo, Japan
| 
|-
| Loss
| align=center| 3-4
| Naoki Sakurada
| Submission (armbar)
| Shooto - Shooto
| 
| align=center| 5
| align=center| 0:00
| Tokyo, Japan
| 
|-
| Loss
| align=center| 3-3
| Yoshimasa Ishikawa
| Submission (guillotine choke)
| Shooto - Shooto
| 
| align=center| 4
| align=center| 0:00
| Tokyo, Japan
| 
|-
| Loss
| align=center| 3-2
| Yuichi Watanabe
| Decision (unanimous)
| Shooto - Shooto
| 
| align=center| 5
| align=center| 3:00
| Tokyo, Japan
| 
|-
| Win
| align=center| 3-1
| Kazuhiro Kusayanagi
| KO (punch)
| Shooto - Shooto
| 
| align=center| 4
| align=center| 0:58
| Tokyo, Japan
| 
|-
| Loss
| align=center| 2-1
| Manabu Yamada
| KO (punch)
| Shooto - Shooto
| 
| align=center| 1
| align=center| 0:00
| Tokyo, Japan
| 
|-
| Win
| align=center| 2-0
| Suguru Shigeno
| Decision (unanimous)
| Shooto - Shooto
| 
| align=center| 3
| align=center| 3:00
| Tokyo, Japan
| 
|-
| Win
| align=center| 1-0
| Kengo Tsuchida
| TKO (punches)
| Shooto - Shooto
| 
| align=center| 3
| align=center| 0:16
| Tokyo, Japan
|

See also
List of male mixed martial artists

References

External links
 
 Tomonori Ohara at mixedmartialarts.com
 Tomonori Ohara at fightmatrix.com

Japanese male mixed martial artists
Lightweight mixed martial artists
Welterweight mixed martial artists
Mixed martial artists utilizing shootfighting
Mixed martial artists utilizing shootboxing
Mixed martial artists utilizing shoot wrestling
Mixed martial artists utilizing catch wrestling
Japanese catch wrestlers
Living people
Year of birth missing (living people)